Love Me, Alfredo! (Italian: Amami, Alfredo!) is a 1940 Italian romantic drama film directed by Carmine Gallone and starring Maria Cebotari, Claudio Gora and Lucie Englisch. It portrays the relationship between an established opera singer and her lover an unknown composer. The title is a reference to Verdi's La Traviata.

It was shot at Cinecittà Studios in Rome. The film's sets were designed by the art director Guido Fiorini.

Cast
 Maria Cebotari as Maria Dalgeri 
 Claudio Gora as Il compositore Giacomo Varni 
 Lucie Englisch as Luisa Traller 
 Paolo Stoppa as Cecè 
 Luigi Almirante as Romanelli 
 Aristide Baghetti as Il sovrintendente
 Carmen Fortis as Una spettatrice

References

Bibliography 
 Nowell-Smith, Geoffrey. The Companion to Italian Cinema. Cassell, 1996.

External links 
 

1940 films
Italian romantic drama films
1940 romantic drama films
1940s Italian-language films
Films directed by Carmine Gallone
Films shot at Cinecittà Studios
Italian historical romance films
1940s historical romance films
Films set in Milan
1940 comedy films
1940s Italian films